The Devil's Disciple (1926) is an American melodramatic silent film with a primarily African-American cast, written and directed by Oscar Micheaux, on the subject of white slavery in New York City.

References

External links
 
 

1926 films
American black-and-white films
American silent feature films
1926 comedy-drama films
Melodrama films
1920s American films
Silent American comedy-drama films